László Tőkés (born 1 April 1952) is an ethnic Hungarian pastor and politician from Romania. He was a Member of the European Parliament (MEP) from 2007 to 2019. Tőkés served as a Vice-President of the European Parliament from 2010 to 2012.

A bishop of the Reformed Diocese of Királyhágómellék of the Reformed Church in Romania, he is also a former honorary president of the Democratic Alliance of Hungarians in Romania. An effort to transfer Tőkés from his post as an assistant pastor in Timișoara and to evict him from his church flat helped trigger the Romanian Revolution, which overthrew Nicolae Ceaușescu and spelled the end of communism in Romania.

Tőkés is the head of the Hungarian National Council of Transylvania, a civic organisation for Transylvanian Hungarians. He is closely associated with the Hungarian People's Party of Transylvania (PPMT), but not a member of it. He is a member of the Reconciliation of European Histories Group, and co-sponsored the European Parliament resolution of 2 April 2009 on European conscience and totalitarianism.

Family
A native of Cluj, László Tőkés is the son of István Tőkés, professor of theology and former deputy bishop of the largely Hungarian Reformed Church. He was married to Edit Joó, with whom he has three children: sons Máté and Márton, and daughter Ilona. Máté Tőkés, who was only three years old during the Revolution of 1989, later collected the memories of the friends, relatives, and other participants of the events, and in 2005 wrote Egymás tükrében ("In Each Other's Mirror"), a book about his parents and the hardships of the family.

In March 2010, his wife filed for divorce. Edit Tőkés accused the bishop of "numerous affairs" and "absurd habits". The claims of infidelity and mistreatment were confirmed by a former counsellor of the pastor and the divorce decree was issued in February 2011.

Dissident pastor
Like his father, Tőkés was a persistent critic of the totalitarian Ceaușescu regime. While a pastor in the Transylvanian town of Dej, he contributed to the clandestine Hungarian-language journal Ellenpontok ("Counterpoints"; 1981–82). An article there on human rights abuses in Romania appears to have been the occasion of his first harassment by the secret police, the Securitate. He was reassigned to the village of Sânpetru de Câmpie, but refused to go and instead spent two years living in his parents' house in Cluj.

His situation was discussed in the U.S. Senate Committee on Foreign Relations, which led indirectly to his appointment to be assistant pastor in Timișoara, where he gave sermons that opposed the Romanian national government's program of systematisation, which proposed radical restructuring of the infrastructure of Romanian towns and villages. Smaller villages were deemed "irrational" and listed for reduction of services or forced removal of the population and physical destruction. This included the destruction of historic churches and monasteries. The programme was seen by Hungarians and human rights activists as a particular threat to Hungarian villages, although Tőkés' sermons did not single this out, calling for solidarity between Hungarians and Romanians. The governments of Hungary and West Germany, concerned for their national minorities in Transylvania, protested against systematization.

In the summer of 1988, Tőkés organized opposition to systematisation among Hungarian Reformed Church pastors, again drawing the attention of the Securitate. After the Securitate objected to a cultural festival organized on 31 October 1988 (Reformation Day), jointly with the amateur Hungarian-language theatre group "Thalia", Bishop László Papp banned all youth activities in the Banat (the region Timișoara is part of). Tőkés nonetheless worked together with the bishop of the Romanian Orthodox Church on another festival in spring 1989.

On 20 March 1989, Tőkés gave a secretly taped TV interview to two Canadians – former politician Michel Clair and Radio-Canada journalist Réjean Roy (released as Dracula's Shadow – The Real Story Behind the Romanian Revolution). The two were helped by a small group from Székesfehérvár in Hungary who smuggled in videotapes and video cameras.

On 31 March 1989, Papp ordered Tőkés to stop preaching in Timișoara and move to the isolated parish of Mineu. Tőkés refused the order, and his congregation supported him.

On 24 July 1989, the Hungarian State TV investigative show Panorama broadcast the secretly-taped TV interview with Tőkés. Two days later Bishop Papp sent Tőkés a letter, accusing him of slandering the state and saying lies in the interview, and ordered his expulsion.

The bishop began civil proceedings to evict him from his church flat. His power was cut off and his ration book taken away, but his parishioners continued to support and provide for him. The state had some arrested and beaten. At least one, Ernő Ujvárossy, was found dead in the woods outside Timișoara on 14 September, and Tőkés's father was briefly arrested.

In the interview in July 1989, to Hungarian television, Tőkés complained that the Romanians do not even know their human rights. Tőkés explained the message and effect of this interview in a German TV series on the collapse of the Iron Curtain in 2008:

A court ordered Tőkés' eviction on 20 October. He appealed. On 2 November, four attackers armed with knives broke into his flat; Securitate agents looked on while he and his friends fought off the assailants. The Romanian ambassador was summoned to the Hungarian Foreign Ministry and told of the Hungarian government's concern for his safety. His appeal was turned down, and his eviction set for Friday 15 December.

Foreign broadcasters also began showing the secretly taped TV interview, such as ABC's Nightline in the U.S.

December 1989
As 15 December approached, Tőkés' parishioners began something of a vigil outside his flat, refusing two guards' orders to move along. On 15 December, a human chain was formed around the block; the militia were unable to gain access. Tőkés thanked the crowd but advised them to leave, but several hundred stayed in groups close to the flat. His wife, Edit, who was pregnant at the time, fell ill. On 16 December, the family doctor appeared to see Edit. Within half an hour, the mayor of Timișoara appeared with three more doctors, hoping to persuade Edit to go to a hospital. On the advice of their family doctor, she refused.

Shortly afterwards, workmen arrived to repair the damaged windows and door to the flat; presumably the mayor was hoping to defuse matters, but the crowds actually grew, with some young Romanians joining the Hungarian parishioners. Tőkés spoke to the mayor and again urged the crowd to disperse. The crowd remained; the mayor stormed away, returned at noon, and promised that Tőkés would not be evicted. The crowd remained; some of them accused Tőkés of collaborating with the authorities and demanded a written retraction of Tőkés' transfer and eviction. The mayor promised to do so within an hour; if he actually intended to, it proved impossible on a Saturday.

After various negotiations with the mayor and the deputy mayor and the involvement of various delegations, the mayor gave an ultimatum for the crowd to disperse by 5 pm or face fire-brigade water cannons. Tőkés again pleaded with the crowd to disperse, but, possibly convinced that he was acting under threats from the Securitate, they refused. The crowd beckoned him to leave his apartment and come down to the street. He refused, presumably fearful of being seen as the leader of this resistance. 5 pm came and went without water cannons. By 7 pm the crowds extended for several blocks and included many students from the local polytechnic and university, Hungarians and Romanians in a human chain, first singing hymns, but about 7:30 launching into the patriotic song Deșteaptă-te, române! ("Awaken thee, Romanian!"), banned in 1947 at the beginning of the communist dictatorship and sung during the 1987 Brașov rebellion.

In Deletant's words, "The Hungarian protest had now become a Romanian revolt." Cries were raised, "Down with Ceaușescu!" "Down with the regime!" and "Down with Communism!" The crowd moved out from around Tőkés' flat and church, crossed a bridge, and headed for the city centre and Communist Party headquarters, where they threw stones before militia drove them back toward the church around 10 pm and the water cannons finally came into play. However, the crowd seized the cannons, broke them up, and threw the parts into the river Bega. A general spirit of roving riot ensued.

Demonstrations continued the next two days. On Sunday, 17 December, the army fired into the crowd. The number of casualties has been a matter of dispute; early reports were undoubtedly exaggerated. The number of deaths was 73 for the period 16–22 December 1989, and another 20 for the period after Ceaușescu fled. On Elena Ceaușescu's orders, 40 of the dead were transported by lorry to Bucharest and cremated to make identification impossible.

On 18 December, tens of thousands of industrial workers in Timișoara peacefully took up the protest; by 20 December the city was effectively in insurrection.

The news of the protests and the violent government crackdown spread quickly across Romania and triggered many more protests. They quickly escalated into the Romanian Revolution of 1989 that overthrew Ceaușescu and the Communist government.

Bishop of Oradea 

After the dispossession of the discredited Communist bishop of Oradea, László Papp in 1989, Tőkés was elected as a bishop of the Reformed Diocese of Királyhágómellék. He was again re-elected in 2004 for another six-year term. During his tenure, he worked hard for the reorganization of the disintegrated church and the renewal of spiritual life. He emphasised the importance of Hungarian-language education, social responsibility, and missionary work. It was his top priority to win back the properties and schools of the church that had been confiscated by the Communist government, but ownership-restoration in Romania proved to be an extremely difficult, slow and—so far—unsuccessful process.

In spite of financial difficulties, he established new social and educational institutions instead of the old ones. The Christian University of Partium in Oradea was one of the bishop's favourite projects as the first Hungarian-language private university in Romania (opened in 1999). His other notable initiatives are the child-care center in Oradea, an orphanage in Aleșd, Bethesda Health-Care Centre in Arduzel, Peter Reformed Elementary School in Salonta, and a nursing home in Tinca. The Lórántffy Zsuzsanna Ecclesiastical Centre of the Hungarian Reformed Church with a museum, auditorium, and social care centre was inaugurated in 1996.

Political career

In 2007 Tőkés ran for the European Parliament as an independent, receiving the backing of Hungary's Fidesz. At the November 2007 election in Romania, he gained enough votes to win a seat. In competition with the Democratic Alliance of Hungarians in Romania, the main party of Romania's Hungarians, Tőkés was accused, for instance by a leading politician of that party, György Frunda, of splitting the Hungarian vote. Frunda also claimed that Tőkés was helped by President Traian Băsescu and noted that he received 18,000 votes from the historically named Wallachia and Moldavia regions of Romania, places where few Hungarians live. Tőkés commented on election night, "I knocked out the Greater Romania Party", referring to the fact that, while he had won a seat, the far right, anti-Hungarian Greater Romania Party had lost all five of its own.

In the 2009 European Parliament election he headed the party list of the Democratic Alliance of Hungarians in Romania and was re-elected. In May 2010, he became one of the fourteen vice-presidents of the European Parliament. He was elected by 334 votes in favour and 287 abstentions, replacing Pál Schmitt.

He is a signatory of the Prague Declaration on European Conscience and Communism.

In 2014 he was the third on the list of Fidesz for the European Parliament election in Hungary. Before his term ended in 2019, he announced that he would not run for re-election, stating that the European People's Party had "abandoned Christian Europe".

European elections

Awards and honours
In 1990 he received the Four Freedoms Award for the Freedom of Worship.

In June 2009, in Washington, D.C., he was awarded the Truman-Reagan Medal of Freedom for his role in the struggles against Romanian communism.

He received the Order of the Star of Romania from President Traian Băsescu in 2009. President Klaus Iohannis announced in 2016 that he decided to withdraw the honour from Tőkés. "The matter reached my table and I have to make a decision. In my opinion, we should consider certain issues when analysing such questions. The one who grants a distinction wishes to reward the person distinguished, the one who receives and accepts the distinction must recognise Romania and the Constitution of Romania, to appreciate the values that stay at the grounds of the Constitution of Romania. Considering all this, I have decided to withdraw the 'Romania Star' Order from mister László Tőkés," the head of state said at the Cotroceni Palace. Tőkés responded that the cause of the withdrawal of the award – a comment he made to Hungary's Prime Minister Viktor Orbán in 2013 about supposedly proposing to extend a "protectorate status" to Transylvania – was mistranslated. His appeals in Romania were struck down by all judicial institutions by 2016, but Tőkés responded that he would challenge the decision at the High Court of Cassation and Justice and the European Court of Justice.

Notes

References
Deletant, Dennis, Romania under communist rule (1999). Center for Romanian Studies in cooperation with the Civic Academy Foundation (Iași, Romania; Portland, Oregon), .
 Szoczi, Arpad, "Timișoara – The Real Story Behind the Romanian Revolution – 25th Anniversary Edition" (2015). iUniverse, Bloomington, Indiana, .
 Colson, Charles, and Ellen Vaughn, Being the Body: a new call for the Church to be light in the darkness (2003).  W Publishing Group, Nashville, Tennessee, .
  Alex Mihai Stoenescu, Istoria loviturilor de stat din Romania. Vol. 4, part 1 ("The History of Romanian Coups d'État"). Rao publishing house, Bucharest, 2004. An entire chapter is devoted to Tőkés, his background and the December 1989 events.
  Marius Mioc, "Revoluția fără mistere: Începutul revoluției române: cazul Laszlo Tokes" ("A revolution without mysteries: the beginning of the Romanian Revolution: the case of Laszlo Tokes")
  List of people killed in Timișoara during Romanian Revolution, published by Marius Mioc in "Revoluția din Timișoara și falsificatorii istoriei". Editura Sedona, Timișoara 1999
 Pinstripes and Reds: An American Ambassador Caught Between the State Department & the Romanian Communists, 1981–1985 Washington, D.C.: Selous Foundation Press, 1987.

External links

Personal site
European Parliament profile

1952 births
Living people
Romanian Protestant clergy
Calvinist and Reformed ministers
Democratic Union of Hungarians in Romania politicians
Fidesz MEPs
Romanian religious leaders of Hungarian descent
People from Cluj-Napoca
People of the Romanian Revolution
Hungarian bishops
Romanian bishops
Hungarian Calvinist and Reformed Christians
Romanian Calvinist and Reformed Christians
Romanian dissidents
Romanian memoirists
Romanian revolutionaries
Democratic Union of Hungarians in Romania MEPs
MEPs for Romania 2007–2009
MEPs for Romania 2009–2014
MEPs for Hungary 2014–2019
Recipients of the Four Freedoms Award